The Monsterican Dream is the second studio album by Finnish rock band Lordi, released in 2004. It features an overall heavier sound with a more grim look to the band than Lordi's first album.

The album was re-released in Finland as a "Limited Edition" on DVD, which included Lordi's short film The Kin.

Track listing

Limited edition bonus DVD
The Kin Movie
Making of The Kin
Storyboard
Photo Gallery

Singles
"My Heaven Is Your Hell"
"Blood Red Sandman"

Personnel
Credits for The Monsterican Dream adapted from liner notes.

Lordi
 Mr Lordi – vocals, programming, cover art, artwork, layout
 Amen – guitars, backing vocals
 Kita – drums, backing vocals, engineering
 Kalma – bass, backing vocals, engineering
 Enary – keyboards, piano, backing vocals

Production
 Hiili Hiilesmaa – production, engineering, mixing, programming
 Mika Jussila – mastering
 Juha Heininen – engineering
 Tracy Lipp – engineering
 Petri Haggrén – photography

Charts

Certifications

References 

2004 albums
Lordi albums
Drakkar Entertainment albums